Amiral Ronarc'h (D660) is the lead ship of Frégate de défense et d'intervention of the French Navy.

Design and description
The frigate could accommodate 150 personnel, including the usual complement of 110 ship crew and 15 crew for the helicopter detachment.

She is armed with one Oto Melara 76 mm Super Rapid gun and two 20 mm Nexter Narwhal remote controlled weapon station. For surface warfare, Amiral Ronarc'h are equipped with eight Exocet MM40 Block 3 anti-ship missiles, and two Sylver A50 8-cell vertical launch system for 16 MBDA Aster 15/30 anti-aircraft missiles. For anti-submarine warfare, she is equipped with two twin 324 mm torpedo tubes for MU90 Impact torpedoes. The ship also equipped with non-lethal weapon systems for asymmetrical warfare

Her electronic system and sensors consisted of Thales Sea Fire 500 multi-function active electronically scanned array search and track radar, Aquilon integrated communication and identification friend or foe system, SETIS 3.0 combat management system, Kingklip Mark II hull-mounted sonar, CAPTAS-4 towed sonar, Thales SENTINEL electronic support measures suite and CANTO anti-torpedo decoys.

Amiral Ronarc'h also has a hangar and flight deck at stern and could accommodate one SDAM UAV and one NH90 or Guépard Marine (H160M) helicopter equipped with MU90 torpedoes and dipping sonar, air-to-surface missiles, and/or heavy machine gun. The frigates also carries two rigid-hull inflatable boats for patrolling or for Special Forces purpose.

Construction and career
The construction of the ship was started with the first steel cutting ceremony at the Naval Group shipyard in Lorient on 24 October 2019. Her keel was laid down on 17 December 2021. Amiral Ronarc'h was ceremonially launched on 7 November 2022. The ship was partially launched by flooding her construction dock. The frigate was later towed by tugboats to the outfitting pier on the bank of Scorff River.

Reference

External links
 Mise à flot de la première frégate de défense et d’intervention - FDI by Naval News on YouTube

2022 ships
Frigates of the French Navy
Ships built in France